Jinan Yaoqiang International Airport  is the airport serving Jinan, the capital of Shandong Province, China. By road, the airport is connected to the Jinan Ring, Beijing–Shanghai, and Qingdao–Yinchuan Expressways.

In 2018, Jinan Yaoqiang International Airport is the 25th busiest airport in China with 16,611,795 passengers.

In December 2016, Sichuan Airlines began non-stop intercontinental service from Jinan to Los Angeles.

In February 2022, Jinan gained direct flights to Europe with Condor starting Frankfurt. Nearly one year later, in January of 2023, Condor ceased the service again and started flying to Hefei.

Future expansions
In September 2019, CAAC approved a new master plan for the airport.

Airlines and destinations

See also
List of the busiest airports in China

References

External links
Official Website 
Other Information

Airports in Shandong
Transport in Jinan
Airports established in 1992